The Sherwood Anderson Foundation is an organization founded by the children and grandchildren of American short story writer and novelist Sherwood Anderson that gives grants to emerging writers.  The most notable of these is the annual Sherwood Anderson Foundation Writers Award.

 the Foundation's co-presidents were Anderson's grandsons Michael and David Spear.

Award recipients

Winners of the award have ranged from college undergraduates to widely published authors.  Currently, only individuals who have published either "a book of fiction or a collection of short stories in major literary and/or commercial publications" are eligible for the prize.

The winners of the grants include:

See also
List of American literary awards

References

External links
Sherwood Anderson Foundation

American literary awards
Awards established in 1988